The 2018 James Madison Dukes men's soccer team represented James Madison University during the 2018 NCAA Division I men's soccer season. It was the university's 51st season fielding a men's varsity soccer program, and the university's 40th in the Colonial Athletic Association.

The season was highlighted by the Dukes winning both the CAA Regular season as well as the 2018 CAA Men's Soccer Tournament, making it their sixth tournament championship, and their seventh regular season championship. The Dukes earned an automatic berth into the 2018 NCAA Division I Men's Soccer Tournament, where they had their best run in program history, reaching the quarterfinals (Elite Eight) of the competition.

Roster

Schedule 

|-
!colspan=8 style=""| Preseason
|-

|-
!colspan=8 style=""| Regular season
|-

|-
!colspan=8 style=""| CAA Tournament
|-

|-
!colspan=8 style=""| NCAA Tournament
|-

References

External links 
 JMU Soccer Schedule

James Madison Dukes men's soccer seasons
James Madison
James Madison
James Madison
James Madison